Woolwich West was a borough constituency represented in the House of Commons of the Parliament of the United Kingdom from 1918 until 1983. It centred on Eltham, now in the Royal Borough of Greenwich in south-east London.

The constituency was formed for the 1918 general election, when the constituency of Woolwich was divided into Woolwich West and Woolwich East, and abolished in 1983. Although the boundaries changed, Woolwich West in effect became the new Eltham constituency.

Boundaries 
1918–1950: The Metropolitan Borough of Woolwich wards of Dockyard, Eltham, Herbert, River, St. George's, and St Mary's.

1950–1955: The Metropolitan Borough of Woolwich wards of Avery Hill, Herbert, St George's, Sherard, and Well Hall.

1955–1974: The Metropolitan Borough of Woolwich wards of Avery Hill, Coldharbour, Eltham Green, Falconwood, Herbert, Horn Park, Middle Park, New Eltham, St George's, Sherard, Shooters Hill, and Well Hall.

1974–1983: The London Borough of Greenwich wards of academy, Coldharbour, Eltham, Horn Park, Middle Park, New Eltham, St George's, Sherard, Shooters Hill, and Well Hall.

Members of Parliament

Elections

Elections in the 1970s

Elections in the 1960s

Elections in the 1950s

Elections in the 1940s

Elections in the 1930s

Elections in the 1920s

Election in the 1910s

References

Parliamentary constituencies in London (historic)
Constituencies of the Parliament of the United Kingdom established in 1918
Constituencies of the Parliament of the United Kingdom disestablished in 1983
History of the Royal Borough of Greenwich
Woolwich